Daniel Bouman (born 7 February 1998) is an Australian professional footballer who plays as a midfielder.

Club career

Youth
Bouman was born in the Netherlands to a Dutch father and Australian mother and moved to Sydney at the age of four. When his family relocated back to the Netherlands in 2014, he joined FC Groningen as a youth player, after playing as a junior in Australia for GHFA Spirit, Manly United, and Blacktown City. In 2019, he caught the eye after scoring eight goals in 15 appearances with Groningen's under-23 side. During his time at Groningen, he played nearly 100 games for the youth sides.

SC Cambuur
In May 2019, Bouman joined SC Cambuur's senior team. During his time at the club, he played 11 games for the under-21 side and wasn't capped by the senior side. At the end of the season, he left the club due to him being out of contract and not being re-signed after the club was denied promotion to the Eredivise, due to the season being abandoned because of the COVID-19 pandemic.

Central Coast Mariners
In October 2020, Bouman returned to Australia, signing a one-year contract with Central Coast Mariners ahead of the 2020–21 A-League season following trialling with them during the pre-season.

International career
Bouman was selected by Graham Arnold for Australia's under-23 side who competed in the 2020 AFC U-23 Championship, which doubled as qualifiers for the 2020 Olympics. In the tournament, he played in five out of the six matches and helped Australia qualify for the 2020 Olympics.

References

External links

1998 births
Living people
Australian soccer players
Dutch people of Australian descent
Association football midfielders
FC Groningen players
SC Cambuur players
Central Coast Mariners FC players
A-League Men players
Derde Divisie players